The tennis scoring system is a standard widespread method for scoring tennis matches, including pick-up games. Some tennis matches are played as part of a tournament, which may have various categories, such as singles and doubles. The great majority are organised as a single-elimination tournament, with competitors being eliminated after a single loss, and the overall winner being the last competitor without a loss. Optimally, such tournaments have a number of competitors equal to a power of two in order to fully fill out a single elimination bracket. In many professional and top-level amateur events, the brackets are seeded according to a recognised ranking system, in order to keep the best players in the field from facing each other until as late in the tournament as possible; additionally, if byes are necessary because of a less-than-full bracket, those byes in the first round are usually given to the highest-seeded competitors.

A tennis match is composed of points, games, and sets. A set consists of a number of games (a minimum of six), which in turn each consist of points. A set is won by the first side to win six games, with a margin of at least two games over the other side (e.g. 6–3 or 7–5). If the set is tied at six games each, a tie-break is usually played to decide the set. A match is won when a player or a doubles team has won the majority of the prescribed number of sets. Matches employ either a best-of-three (first to two sets wins) or best-of-five (first to three sets wins) set format. The best-of-five set format is usually only used in the men's singles or doubles matches at Grand Slam and Davis Cup matches.

Game score

Description
A game consists of a sequence of points played with the same player serving, and is won by the first side to have won at least four points with a margin of two points or more over their opponent. Normally the server's score is always called first and the receiver's score second. Score calling in tennis is unusual in that (except in tie-breaks) each point has a corresponding call that is different from its point value. The current point score is announced orally before each point by the umpire, or by the server if there is no umpire.

For instance, if the server has won three points so far in the game, and the non-server has won one, the score is "40–15".

When both sides have won the same number of points within a given game—i.e., when each side has won one, or two, points—the score is described as "15 all" and "30 all", respectively. However, if each player has won three points, the score is called as "deuce", not "40 all". From that point on in the game, whenever the score is tied, it is described as "deuce" regardless of how many points have been played.

However, if the score is called in French, for example at the French Open, the first occurrence of "40 all" in a single game may be called as such ("40-A", "Quarante-A", or "Quarante partout"). Thereafter, "deuce" ("Égalité" in French) is used for all other occurrences when the score returns to "40 all" within the same game.

In standard play, scoring beyond a "deuce" score, in which the players have scored three points each, requires that one player must get two points ahead in order to win the game. This type of tennis scoring is known as "advantage scoring" (or "ads"). The side which wins the next point after deuce is said to have the advantage. If they lose the next point, the score is again deuce, since the score is tied. If the side with the advantage wins the next point, that side has won the game, since they have a lead of two points. When the server is the player with the advantage, the score may be called as "advantage in". When the server's opponent has the advantage, the score may be called as "advantage out". These phrases are sometimes shortened to "ad in" or "van in" (or "my ad") and "ad out" (or "your ad"). Alternatively, the players' names are used: in professional tournaments the umpire announces the score in this format (e.g., "advantage Nadal" or "advantage Williams").

In the USTA rule book (but not the ITF rules), there is the following comment: "'Zero,' 'one,' 'two,' and 'three,' may be substituted for 'Love', '15', '30', and '40.' This is particularly appropriate for matches with an inexperienced player or in which one player does not understand English."

For tie-breaks, the calls are simply the number of points won by each player:

History
The origins of the 15, 30, and 40 scores are believed to be medieval French. The earliest reference is in a ballad by Charles D'Orleans in 1435 which refers to quarante cinq ("forty-five"), which gave rise to modern 40. In 1522, there is a sentence in Latin "we are winning 30, we are winning 45". The first recorded theories about the origin of 15 were published in 1555 and 1579. However, the origins of this convention remain obscure.

It is sometimes believed that clock faces were used to keep score on court, with a quarter move of the minute hand to indicate a score of 15, 30, and 45. When the hand moved to 60, the game was over. However, in order to ensure that the game could not be won by a one-point difference in players' scores, the idea of "deuce" was introduced. To make the score stay within the "60" ticks on the clock face, the 45 was changed to 40. Therefore, if both players had 40, the first player to score would receive ten, and that would move the clock to 50. If the player scored a second time before the opponent is able to score, they would be awarded another ten and the clock would move to 60. The 60 signifies the end of the game. However, if a player fails to score twice in a row, then the clock would move back to 40 to establish another "deuce".

Although this suggestion might sound attractive, the first reference to tennis scoring (as mentioned above) is in the 15th century, and at that time clocks measured only the hours (1 to 12). It was not until about 1690, when the more accurate pendulum escapement was invented, that clocks regularly had minute hands. So the concept of tennis scores originating from the clock face could not have come from medieval times.

However, the clock at Wells Cathedral in England which dates from 1386 had an inner dial with 60 minutes and a minute indicator and tolled every quarter hour. Likewise the clock erected at Rouen, France, in 1389 tolled every fifteen minutes. So by the end of the 14th century, on the most advanced clocks, minutes were being marked and quarter hours were being tolled. So a clock face with minutes and quarter hours would likely have been familiar to the English and French nobles by 1435 and 1522. It is not hard to imagine that they might use a mock up of a clock face to keep score and that they would score by quarter hours since that is when the clocks tolled.

Another theory is that the scoring nomenclature came from the French game jeu de paume (a precursor to tennis which initially used the hand instead of a racket). Jeu de paume was very popular before the French Revolution, with more than 1,000 courts in Paris alone. The traditional court was 90 feet (pieds du roi) in length with 45 feet on each side. The server moved 15 feet closer after scoring, another 15 feet after scoring again, and an addition 10 feet by scoring a third time.

The use of "love" for zero probably derives from the phrase "playing for love", meaning "without stakes being wagered, for nothing". Another explanation is that it derives from the French expression for "the egg" (l'œuf) because an egg looks like the number zero. This is similar to the origin of the term "duck" in cricket, supposedly from "duck's egg", referring to a batsman who has been called out without scoring a run. Another possibility comes from the Dutch expression iets voor lof doen, which means to do something for praise, implying no monetary stakes. Another theory on the origins of the use of "love" comes from the notion that, at the start of any match, when scores are at zero, players still have "love for each other".

Alternative ("no-ad") game scoring
A popular alternative to advantage scoring, nowadays used at exhibition matches is "no-advantage" or "no-ad" scoring, created by James Van Alen in order to shorten match playing time. No-advantage scoring is a method in which the first player to reach four points wins the game in all circumstances. No-ad scoring eliminates the requirement that a player must win by two points after a tie. Therefore, if the game is tied at deuce, the next player to win a point wins the game. This method of scoring is used in most World TeamTennis matches. When this style of play is implemented, at deuce, the receiver then chooses from which side of the court he or she desires to return the serve. However, in no-ad mixed doubles play, each gender always serves to the same gender at game point and during the final point of tiebreaks.

Handicap scoring
In the early 20th century, it was common for tournaments to have handicap events alongside the main events. In handicap events, the lesser-skilled player is given a certain number of points in each game. This is done so that players of different skill levels can have a competitive match. These handicaps consisted of two numbers "A" and "B" separated by a period "A.B", where "A" is the player's starting score and "B" is the number of games where the player receives an extra point. For example, a player with a handicap of "15.2" would start every game with a score of "15". In each series of six games, the player would also receive an extra point in two of the games. Therefore, they would start two out of every six games with "30" and the remaining four out of six games with "15". These handicap ratings where a player receives points can be denoted with an "R" in front, where the "R" indicates the player is receiving points. It is also possible to have a handicap system where the player owes point due to being higher-skilled, in which case the same two-number system is also used. These owed handicaps are denoted with an "O" in front that is short for "owed".

Set score

Description
In tennis, a set consists of a sequence of games played with alternating service and return roles. There are two types of set formats that require different types of scoring.

An advantage set is played until a player or team has won at least six games and that player or team has a two-game lead over their opponent(s). The set continues, without tiebreak(er), until a player or team wins the set by two games. Advantage sets are no longer played under the rules of the United States Tennis Association, nor in the Australian Open starting from 2019; and since 2022 for all other tournaments, including the French Open, Fed Cup & the Olympics. Wimbledon, from 2019 to 2021, used a unique scoring system for the last set where the players continued to play after 6–all as in an advantage set until a player earned a two-game lead. However, if the players reached 12–all, a seven-point tie-breaker was played to determine the winner. Mixed doubles at the Grand Slams (except for Wimbledon) are a best-of-three format with the final set being played as a "Super Tie Break" (sometimes referred to as a "best-of-two" format) even at Wimbledon, which still plays a best-of-three match with all sets played as tie-break sets.

A tie-break set is played with the same rules as the advantage set, except that when the score is tied at 6–6, a tie-break game (or tiebreaker) is played. Typically, the tie-break game continues until one side has won seven points with a margin of two or more points. However, many tie-break games are played with different tiebreak point requirements, such as eight or 10 points. Often, a seven-point tie-breaker is played when the set score is tied at 6–6 to determine who wins the set. If the tiebreak score gets to 6–6, then whichever player to win the best of two points wins the set.

Unlike games, set scores are counted in the ordinary manner (1, 2, 3 etc.), except that zero games is called "love". The score is called at the end of each game, with the leading player's score first (e.g. "A leads 3–2"), or as "x all". When a player wins a set, it is called as "game and first set", "game and second set" etc.

In doubles, service alternates between the teams. One player serves for an entire service game, with that player's partner serving for the entirety of the team's next service game. Players of the receiving team receive the serve on alternating points, with each player of the receiving team declaring which side of the court (deuce or ad side) they will receive serve on for the duration of the set. Teams alternate service games every game.

Comparison 
Advantage sets sometimes continue much longer than tie-break sets. The 2010 Wimbledon first-round match between John Isner and Nicolas Mahut, which is the longest professional tennis match in history, notably ended with Isner winning the fifth set by 70–68. The match lasted in total 11 hours and five minutes, with the fifth set alone lasting eight hours, 11 minutes. 

Nevertheless, even tie-break sets can last a long time. For instance, once players reach 6–6 set score and also reach 6–6 tiebreaker score, play must continue until one player has a two-point advantage, which can take a considerable time. Sets decided by tiebreakers, however, are typically significantly shorter than extended advantage sets.

The set is won by the first player (or team) to have won at least six games and at least two games more than his or her opponent. Traditionally, sets would be played until both these criteria had been met, with no maximum number of games. To shorten matches, James Van Alen created a tie-breaker system, which was widely introduced in the early 1970s. If the score reaches 6–5 (or 5–6), one further game is played. If the leading player wins this game, the set is won 7–5 (or 5–7). If the trailing player wins the game, the score is tied at 6–6 and a special tiebreaker game is played. The winner of the tiebreak wins the set by a score of 7–6 (or 6–7).

The tiebreak is sometimes not employed for the final set of a match and an advantage set is used instead. Therefore, the deciding set must be played until one player or team has won two more games than the opponent. Of the major tennis championships, this only applies in the French Open. In the US Open, a tiebreak is played in the deciding set (fifth set for the men, third set for the women) at six all. From 2019 to 2021, in Wimbledon, a tiebreak was played if the score reached 12 all in the final set. In the Australian Open, a "first to 10" tiebreak is played in the deciding set if it reaches six-all. (When the tiebreak was first introduced at Wimbledon in 1971, it was invoked at 8–8 rather than 6–6.) The US Open formerly held "Super Saturday" where the two men's semi-finals were played along with the women's final on the second Saturday of the event; therefore a tie-break was more prudent where player rest and scheduling is more important.

In 2022 on behalf of the Australian Open, Roland-Garros, Wimbledon and the US Open, the Grand Slam Board announced the joint decision to play a 10-point tie-break at all Grand Slams, to be played when the score reaches six games all in the final set.  Should the tiebreaker game deciding the match be tied at 9-all, whoever scores two straight points wins.

Scoring a tiebreak game 
At a score of six all, a set is often determined by one more game called a "twelve point tiebreaker" (or just "tiebreak"). Only one more game is played to determine the winner of the set; the score of the resulting completed set is 7–6 or 6–7 (though it can be six all if a player retires before completion).

Points are counted using ordinary numbering. The set is won by the player who has scored at least seven points in the tiebreak and at least two points more than their opponent. For example, if the score is six points to five and the player with six points wins the next point, they win the tiebreak (seven points to five), as well as the set (seven games to six). If the player with five points wins the point instead (for a score of six all), the tiebreak continues and cannot be won on the next point (7–6 or 6–7), since no player will be two points ahead. In the scoring of the set, sometimes the tiebreak points are shown as well as the game count, e.g., 7–610–8. Another way of listing the score of the tiebreak is to list only the loser's points. For example, if the set score is listed as 7–6(8), the tiebreak score was 10–8 (since the eight is the loser's score, and the winner must win by two points). Similarly, 7–6(3) means the tiebreak score was 7–3.

The player who would normally be serving after 6–6 is the one to serve first in the tiebreak, and the tiebreak is considered a service game for this player. The server begins his or her service from the deuce court and serves one point. After the first point, the serve changes to the first server's opponent. Each player then serves two consecutive points for the remainder of the tiebreak. The first of each two-point sequence starts from the server's advantage court and the second starts from the deuce court. In this way, the sum of the scores is even when the server serves from the deuce court. After every six points, the players switch ends of the court; note that the side-changes during the tiebreak will occur in the middle of a server's two-point sequence. At the end of the tiebreak, the players switch ends of the court again, since the set score is always odd (13 games).

An alternative tie-break system called the "Coman Tie-Break" is sometimes used by the United States Tennis Association. Scoring is the same, but end changes take place after the first point and then after every four points. This approach allows the servers of doubles teams to continue serving from the same end of the court as during the body of the set. It also reduces the advantage the elements (e.g. wind and sun) could give playing the first six points of a seven-point tiebreak on one side of the court. Another tie-break system is called the "super tie-breaker" and it consists of one player reaching a total of 10 points.  The player must win by two points so there is no limit to the highest number of points. A typically close score may look like 10–8.

At Wimbledon, a tie-break was not played in the final set until the score reaches 12 all. At the Australian Open, a tie-break was played in the final set at six all, but continued until one player had ten points and was leading by two. The US Open used a conventional, first to seven tie-break at six all in the final set. The French Open was the only Grand Slam or professional tournament where a final-set tie-break was not played and it was played as an advantage set until the 2022 edition.  In March 2022, the French Open and all other Grand Slams adopted the “10-point tie-break” when the 5th set reaches six games all (6–6).

History of the tiebreak
The tiebreaker – more recently shortened to just "tiebreak", though both terms are still used interchangeably – was invented by James Van Alen and unveiled in 1965 as an experiment at the pro tournament he sponsored at Newport Casino, Rhode Island, after an earlier, unsuccessful attempt to speed up the game by the use of his so-called "Van Alen Streamlined Scoring System" ("VASSS"). For two years before the Open Era, in 1955 and 1956, the United States Pro Championship in Cleveland, Ohio, was played by VASSS rules. The scoring was the same as that in table tennis, with sets played to 21 points and players alternating five services, with no second service. The rules were created partially to limit the effectiveness of the powerful service of the reigning professional champion, Pancho Gonzales. Even with the new rules, however, Gonzales beat Pancho Segura in the finals of both tournaments. Even though the 1955 match went to five sets, with Gonzales barely holding on to win the last one 21–19, it is reported to have taken 47 minutes to complete. The fans attending the matches preferred the traditional rules, however, and in 1957 the tournament reverted to the old method of scoring.

Van Alen called his innovation a "tiebreaker", and he actually proposed two different kinds or versions of it: best-five-of-nine-points tiebreaker and best-seven-of-12-points tiebreaker. The first lasts a maximum of nine points, and awards victory in the set to whichever player or team first reaches five points – even if the other player or team already has four: the margin of victory can be a single point. Because this "nine-point" tiebreaker must end after a maximum of nine points, even if neither player or team has a two-point (or greater) margin, Van Alen also called it a "sudden-death tiebreaker" (if and when the score reached four points all, both players faced simultaneous set point and/or match point.). This type of tiebreaker had its Grand Slam debut at 1970 US Open and was employed there until 1974. It was also used at Wimbledon in 1971, and for a while on the Virginia Slims circuit and in American college tennis. This format is still used at the World TeamTennis.

The other type of tiebreaker Van Alen introduced is the "12-point" tiebreaker that is most familiar and widely used today. Because it ends as soon as either player or team reaches seven points, provided that this player or team leads the other at that point by at least two points, it can actually be over in as few as seven points. However, because the winning player or team must win by a margin of at least two points, a 12-point tiebreaker may go beyond 12 points – sometimes well beyond. That is why Van Alen derisively likened it to a "lingering death", in contrast to the nine-point (or fewer) "sudden-death tiebreaker" that he recommended and preferred.

The impetus to use some kind of a tie-breaking procedure gained force after a monumental 1969 struggle at Wimbledon between Pancho Gonzales and Charlie Pasarell. This was a five-set match that lasted five hours and 12 minutes and took two days to complete. In the fifth set the 41-year-old Gonzales won all seven match points that Pasarell had against him, twice coming back from 0–40 deficits. The final score was 22–24, 1–6, 16–14, 6–3, 11–9 for Gonzales.

The tiebreaker gave tennis a definite "finish line".

In what follows, the "final set" means the fifth set for best-of-five matches, and the third set for best-of-three matches.

In 1970, the US Open introduced the nine-point tiebreaker rule for all sets that reach 6–6, both in singles and in doubles. The 12-point tiebreaker format was introduced in 1975.

In 1971, the nine-point tiebreaker was introduced at Wimbledon (the first scoring change at Wimbledon in 94 years).

In 1972, Wimbledon put into effect a 12-point tiebreaker when the score in a set reached 8–8 in games unless the set was such that one of the players could achieve a match victory by winning it.

In 1979, Wimbledon changed their rules so that a (12-point) tiebreak would be played once any set except the final set reached 6–6 in games.

In 1989, the Davis Cup adopted the tie-break in all sets except for the final set, and then extended it to the final set starting in 2016.

In 2001, the Australian Open adopted the tiebreak at 6–6 in the final set in men's and women's doubles matches. The French Open followed in 2007.

In 2001, the Australian Open replaced the deciding third set of mixed doubles with an eighteen-point "match tiebreak" (first to ten points and win by two points wins the match). Despite some criticism of the change by fans and former pros, the US Open (from 2003) and the French Open (from 2007) have followed the Australian Open in using the same format for mixed doubles. Wimbledon continues to play a traditional best-of-three match, with a tie-break in the final set at 12–12 (advantage set was played before 2019).

Likewise, the ATP Tour introduced a match tiebreak format for doubles tournaments in 2006. The WTA Tour adopted that rule in 2007.

Tie-break sets are now nearly universal in all levels of play, for all sets in a match; however, the tie-break is not a compulsory element in any set, and the actual formatting of sets and tie-breaks depends on the tournament director in tournaments, and, in private matches, on the players' agreement before play begins. Tie-breaks were not used in the final set in the Australian Open for singles until 2018, the French Open until 2021, Wimbledon until 2018, or the Fed Cup until 2018, nor were they used for final sets in Davis Cup play or the Olympics until 2012. The US Open was the only major tournament to use a tiebreak in the final set for singles from 1970 to 2018. However, the Australian Open and French Open also use a final-set tiebreak in both men's and women's doubles.

After criticism of two lengthy semifinals in the 2018 Men's singles, Wimbledon announced the 2019 Championships would use final-set tiebreaks if the score reached 12 games all. The first such was in the Men's doubles third round, with Henri Kontinen and John Peers defeating Rajeev Ram and Joe Salisbury.

Shortly following Wimbledon's final set tiebreak introduction announcement, the Australian Open also for their 2019 tournament introduced a "super-tiebreak" at 6–6 for both singles and doubles (but not mixed doubles) in the final set, replacing the previous format in which the final set would continue until one player was ahead by two games. The new format for the final set is similar to the "12-point tiebreaker", but with the winner being the first to 10 points instead of seven (and they must still win by two points). Tennis Australia has called this a "10-point tiebreak", though this is inconsistent with the reasoning behind the naming of the "12-point tiebreaker" representing a score of 7–5; the analogical name would be "18-point tiebreaker" representing a score of 10–8.

Prior to the 2022 French Open, the French remained the only grand slam tournament that did not use any form of a tie-break for singles in the final set; each grand slam event had a different final-set scoring system. In March 2022, the ATP, WTA and ITF announced that final-set tiebreaks in all Grand Slams will have a 10-point tie break ("18-point tiebreaker", first to 10) when the set reaches six games all (6-6). The Olympics will employ this come 2024.

Alternative set scoring format
While traditional sets continue until a player wins at least six games by a margin of at least two games there are some alternative set scoring formats in use. A common alternative set format is the eight or nine game pro set. Instead of playing until one player reaches six games with a margin of two games, one plays until one player wins eight or nine games with a margin of two games. A tie-break is then played at eight or nine games all. While the format is not used in modern professional matches or recognized by the ITF rules, it was supposedly used in early professional tours. It is commonly utilized in various amateur leagues and high school tennis as a shorter alternative to a best-of-three match, but longer than a traditional tie-break set. In addition, eight game pro sets were used during doubles for all Division I college dual matches, until the 2014–2015 season.

Another alternative set format are so called "short sets" where the first to four games to win by two games. In this format a tie-break is played at four games all. The ITF experimented with this format in low level Davis Cup matches, but the experiment was not continued. Nevertheless, this alternative remains as an acceptable alternative in the ITF rules of Tennis.

Another alternative set format is seen in World Team Tennis where the winner of a set is the first to win five games and a nine-point tie-break is played at 4–4.

An alternative to Tennis Australia's Fast4 shorter scoring method is Thirty30 tennis where every game starts at 30–30. Thirty30 (T30) is a shortened format of tennis and can be described as the tennis equivalent of the Twenty20 (T20) format of cricket. Sets are rather short: One set is generally played in 20 minutes.

Match score

Description
The winner is the side that wins more than half of the sets, and the match ends as soon as this is achieved. Men's matches may be the best of either three or five sets, while women's and mixed doubles matches are usually best of three sets.

The alternation of service between games continues throughout the match without regard to sets, but the ends are changed after each odd game within a set (including the last game). If, for example, the second set of a match ends with the score at 6–3, 1–6, the ends are changed as the last game played was the 7th (odd) game of the set and in spite of it being the 16th (even) game of the match. Even when a set ends with an odd game, ends are again changed after the first game of the following set. A tiebreaker game is treated as a single game for the purposes of this alternation. Since tiebreakers always result in a score of 7–6, there is always a court change after the tiebreaker.

The score of a complete match may be given simply by sets won, or with the scores in each set given separately. In either case, the match winner's score is stated first. In the former, shorter form, a match might be listed as 3–1 (i.e. three sets to one). In the latter form, this same match might be further described as "7–5, 6–7(4–7), 6–4, 7–6(8–6)". (As noted above, an alternate form of writing the tiebreak score lists only the loser's scoree.g., "7–6(6)" for the fourth set in the example.) This match was won three sets to one, with the match loser winning the second set on a tiebreaker. The numbers in parentheses, normally included in printed scorelines but omitted when spoken, indicate the duration of the tiebreaker following a given set. Here, the match winner lost the second-set tiebreaker 7–4 and won the fourth-set tiebreaker 8–6.

Total points won
Because tennis is scored set by set and game by game, a player may lose a match despite winning the majority of points and/or games played.

Consider a player who wins six games in each of two sets, all by a score of game–30. The winner has scored 4×12 = 48 points and the loser 2×12 = 24. Suppose also that the loser wins four games in each set, all by a score of game-love. The loser has scored 4×8 = 32 points and the winner zero in those games. The final score is a win by 6–4, 6–4; total points 48–56.

An example of this in actual practice was the record-breaking Isner-Mahut match in the Wimbledon first round, 22–24 June 2010. American John Isner beat Nicolas Mahut of France 6–4, 3–6, 6–7(7–9), 7–6(7–3), 70–68 – Mahut winning a total of 502 points to Isner's 478.

Total games won
Likewise, a player may lose a match despite winning the majority of games played (or win a match despite losing the majority of games). Roger Federer won the 2009 Wimbledon final over Andy Roddick (5–7, 7–6(8–6), 7–6(7–5), 3–6, 16–14) despite Roddick's winning more games (39, versus Federer's 38). Roger Federer also lost the 2019 Wimbledon final, despite winning more games (and in fact more points as well) than Novak Djokovic.

Announcing the score
When playing a match, it is usually best to report each score out loud with one's opponent to avoid conflicts. During a game, the server has the responsibility to announce the game score before serving. This is done by announcing the server's score first. If, for example, the server loses the first three points of the service game, the server would say "love–40". This is to be done every time. After a set is complete, the server, before serving for the first game of the next set, announces the set scores so far completed in the match, stating their own scores first. If the server has won the first two sets and is beginning the third, the server would say, "two–love, new set." If the server had lost the first two sets, the server would say, "love–two, new set." Finally, after the completion of the match, either player, when asked the score, announces their own scores first.

As an example, consider a match between Victoria Azarenka and Ana Ivanovic. Azarenka wins the first set 6–4, Ivanovic wins the next set 7–6 (winning the tie break 7–4), and Azarenka wins the final set 6–0.

At the end of each set, the umpire would announce the winner of each set:
Game, first set, Azarenka.
Game, second set, Ivanovic.

At the completion of the match, the result would be announced as:

Game, set, match, (Victoria) Azarenka, two sets to one, six–four, six–seven, six–love.

The result would be written as:

 Victoria Azarenka defeated  Ana Ivanovic 6–4, 6–7(4–7), 6–0

The score is always written and announced in respect to the winner of the match. The score of the tiebreak is not included in announcing the final result; it is simply said "seven–six" or "six–seven" regardless of the score in the tiebreak.

If a match ends prematurely due to one player retiring or being disqualified (defaulting), the partial score at that point is announced as the final score, with the remaining player as the nominal winner. For instance, the result in the final of the 2012 Aegon Championships was written and announced as follows:

 Marin Čilić defeated  David Nalbandian 6–7(3–7), 4–3 (default)
Code violation, unsportsmanlike conduct, default, Mr. (David) Nalbandian.

Variations and slang 
During informal play of tennis, especially at tennis clubs in the U.S. (also in other English speaking countries), score announcements are frequently shortened with the use of abbreviations. For example, a score 15 is replaced with "five", or in some cases "fif". "Love" is often substituted to indicate "zero". Similarly, the scores of 30 and 40 may sometimes be spoken as "three" or "four" respectively. A score of 15 all may sometimes be announced as "fives." To further confuse score announcements, a score of 30 all (30–30) may often be called "deuce", and the following point referred to as "ad in" or "ad out" (or "my ad" or "your ad"), depending on which player (or team) won the point. The logic for this is that a 30 all score is effectively the same as deuce (40–40), in that one must win the next two points to win the game.

Scorecards

For formal scorekeeping, the official scoring the match (e.g., the chair umpire) fills out a scorecard, either on paper or electronically. The scorecard allows the official to record details for each point, as well as rule violations and other match information. Standard markings for each point are:

 ⁄ – point won
 A – point won via ace
 D – point won via double-fault
 C – point won via code violation
 T – point won via time violation

An additional dot is marked in a score box to indicate a missed first serve fault.

Notes

Further reading
 Faulkner, Trish & Lemelman, Vivian (1999).The Complete Idiot's Guide to Tennis. New York: Macmillan Publishing 

Score
Tennis terminology
Scoring (tennis)